Lisa Robin Kelly (March 5, 1970 – August 15, 2013) was an American actress. She was best known for her role as Laurie Forman on the TV series That '70s Show.

Early life
Kelly was born in Southington, Connecticut, and raised there and in Mooresville, North Carolina. Her parents were Thomas Carl Kelly and Linda Diane (née Grimm) Kelly. She earned a BFA in acting from The Theatre School at DePaul University in Chicago in 1992.

Career
Kelly made her debut in the 1992 Married... with Children episode "Kelly Doesn't Live Here Anymore". She appeared again in 1994 in episodes of Silk Stalkings, the X-Files episode "Syzygy" from its third season, and on Charmed  in 1999, as well as in direct-to-video and television films such as Amityville Dollhouse, Late Last Night and the theatrical film Jawbreaker.

Kelly played Laurie Forman, the older sister of Eric Forman, on That '70s Show. She abruptly left the show midway through the third season, and her character was written out of the show to "attend beauty school".  She returned to the show in the fifth season for four episodes but was replaced with Christina Moore in the sixth season. In an interview with ABC News, Kelly admitted that "with That '70s Show I was guilty of a drinking problem, and I ran". Kelly attributed her abuse of alcohol to trauma following a miscarriage.

Legal issues
In August 2010, Kelly was arrested in North Carolina on a charge of driving while impaired. In November 2010, she  guilty and was fined and sentenced to 12 months of unsupervised probation.

On March 31, 2012, Kelly was arrested on a felony charge of corporal injury upon a spouse and was released on $10,000 bail. The charge was based on a complaint filed by her ex-boyfriend, John Michas. She later made public statements saying that she was the one who had been assaulted and denied Michas' claim that she assaulted him. The Los Angeles County District Attorney declined to file charges.

In November 2012, police in Mooresville, North Carolina, arrested the 42-year-old Kelly and her 61-year-old husband, Robert Joseph Gilliam, after responding to a disturbance at their home. Both were charged with assault and released on bond. She later filed for divorce and a restraining order against Gilliam.

On June 23, 2013, Kelly was arrested for a suspected DUI when law enforcement responded to a call about a parked car blocking a lane of traffic on the I-5 freeway. She subsequently failed a field-sobriety test.

Death
Days after checking into Pax Rehab House in Altadena, California, Kelly died in her sleep at the facility on August 15, 2013, age 43. On January 3, 2014, the Los Angeles Department of Coroner concluded that her death was due to an accidental unspecified oral "multiple drug intoxication".

Filmography

Film

Television

References

External links

1970 births
2013 deaths
20th-century American actresses
21st-century American actresses
Accidental deaths in California
American film actresses
American soap opera actresses
American television actresses
Actresses from Connecticut
Drug-related deaths in California
People from Southington, Connecticut